Abdul Rahim Muslim Dost (Urdu: عبد الرحیم مسلم دوست) is an Afghan journalist and jeweller and a former Islamist militant of Taliban and member of ISIL Khorasan Province in late 2015 he publicly disassociated himself from ISIL Khorasan and left militancy, condemning the killing of innocent people by ISIL in Afghanistan.

He also was formerly held in extrajudicial detention in the United States Guantanamo Bay detention camps, in Cuba.

In 2014, he became a member of the militant Islamic State of Iraq and the Levants Afghanistan branch. He left the group in late 2015, claiming that Khorasan province became a tool of "regional intelligence agencies and started torturing innocent people." He described the Hafiz Saeed Khan, the emir of Khorasan province, as "illiterate" for approving attacks on civilians.

History

In 1979, Dost was among those, led by Juhayman al-Otaybi, who were involved in the Grand Mosque seizure in Mecca, Saudi Arabia. He was arrested after the Saudi government stormed the Mosque, but was somehow freed and fled to Peshawar, Pakistan.

2001 capture and Guantanamo
Muslim Dost and his brother were captured on November 17, 2001, and later released on 17 April 2005 with no charges held against him. His Guantanamo Internment Serial Number was 561.

The allegations against Muslim Dost, in his Combatant Status Review Tribunal, was that he was a member of the Jamaat al Dawa al Quran (JDQ) militant group, and served as a contact between that group and Al Qaeda. Muslim Dost acknowledged being a member of JDQ, but said he joined long ago, during the Soviet invasion of Afghanistan.

Muslim Dost's brother was also a journalist; was also a held in extrajudicial detention in Guantanamo; was also released by the Americans following his Tribunal.  Their presence in Guantanamo was discussed in the press prior the Department of Defense released the official list of detainee identities.

He has been noted for his poetry while detained by the American government and the lengths he went through to record it, ranging from scratching with a spoon onto polystyrene teacups to using rubbery pens, and has received much esteem in this regard. His account on his stay at Guantanamo, The Broken Chains, is currently being translated into English.

Determined not to have been an enemy combatant

Abdul Rahim Muslim Dost was one of the 38 captives the Bush Presidency determined had not been enemy combatants after all. The Department of Defense refers to these men as No Longer Enemy Combatants.

Abdul Rahim Muslim Dost was freed on April 20, 2005, with sixteen other Afghans whose Tribunals had determined they were not enemy combatants. The Associated Press reported that their release ceremony was addressed by Afghan Chief Justice Fazl Hadi Shinwari. Carlotta Gall of The New York Times reported that the Chief Justice encouraged the men to regard their detention as something sent from God. The reports stated that the Chief Justice warned the cleared men that a candid description of their detention could damage the chances of other Afghan captives to be released.

Abdul Rahim Muslim Dost was one of the three captives who chose to address the Press.  
Carlotta Gall described him as openly disagreeing with the Chief Justice as to whether any Afghans should have been sent to Guantanamo:

Both reports quoted Chief Justice Fazil Hadi Shinwari distinguishing three categories of captives:

Combatant Status Review Tribunal

Initially the Bush administration asserted that they could withhold all the protections of the Geneva Conventions to captives from the war on terror.  This policy was challenged before the Judicial branch. Critics argued that the United States could not evade its obligation to conduct competent tribunals to determine whether captives are, or are not, entitled to the protections of prisoner of war status.

Subsequently, the Department of Defense instituted the Combatant Status Review Tribunals.  The Tribunals, however, were not authorized to determine whether the captives were lawful combatants—rather they were merely empowered to make a recommendation as to whether the captive had previously been correctly determined to match the Bush administration's definition of an enemy combatant.

Summary of Evidence memo

A Summary of Evidence memo was prepared for Abdul Rahim Muslim Dost's Combatant Status Review Tribunal, on 29 September 2004.
 	
The memo listed the following allegations against him:

Transcript
Muslim Dost chose to participate in his Combatant Status Review Tribunal.
On March 3, 2006, in response to a court order from Jed Rakoff the Department of Defense published a sixteen-page summarized transcript from his Combatant Status Review Tribunal.
According to Fox News, the US considered Muslim Dost  "too old and sick to get back in the fight" and his intelligence value had been "maxed out".

2006 Pakistan arrest
On September 30, 2006, the Chinese news agency Xinhua reported that Muslim Dost had been arrested by Pakistani officials. The article quotes Muslim Dost's brother, who linked the arrest to criticisms of the Inter-Services Intelligence Directorate's role in the capture of Guantanamo detainees. Muslim Dost's brother said he was arrested while leaving his Mosque. Local Peshawar Police Superintendent Iftikhar Khan denied any knowledge of Muslim Dost's arrest, but acknowledged Inter-Services Intelligence officials may have executed a covert arrest. In 2008, Muslim Dost was released from detention as part of a prisoner swap between the Pakistani Government and the Pakistani Taliban, who had been holding Pakistan's ambassador to Afghanistan and others hostage.

Affiliation with Islamic State of Iraq and the Levant
In July 2014, Abdul Raheem Muslim Dost swore allegiance to the leader of ISIL, Abu Bakr al-Baghdadi, and began recruiting fighters and distributing propaganda for its Khorasan branch in the Nuristan and Kunar provinces of Afghanistan, parts of the Afghan-Pakistan tribal belt, and in some Afghan refugee camps in Peshawar. In a video released in 2014, Dost claimed to have had a vision about the reestablishment of the Caliphate, while in an interview with a journalist, Dost admitted being a supporter of the group, while denying reports he held an influential position in it.

In late 2015, Dost publicly disassociated himself from ISIL in Khorasan, condemning the group's leadership and killings in Afghanistan. He reportedly maintained his allegiance to Abu Bakr al-Baghdadi and his self-proclaimed Caliphate.

See also

 Poems From Guantánamo

References

External links
VIDEO: ANDREW MOTION READS POEMS FROM GUANTÁNAMO 
In a Jail in Cuba Beat the Heart of a Poet: Afghan, Now Freed by U.S., Scribbled on Paper Cups but Never Stopped Writing, The Washington Post, April 24, 2005
Ex-inmates share Guantanamo ordeal, BBC, May 2, 2005
Dismay at US Koran 'desecration', BBC, May 8, 2005
Writing poetry was the balm that kept Guantanamo prisoners from going mad: Former inmates say they wrote thousands of lines, San Francisco Chronicle, July 17, 2005
DoJ Memorandum

Afghan expatriates in Pakistan
Afghan extrajudicial prisoners of the United States
Pashtun people
Guantanamo detainees known to have been released
Living people
20th-century Afghan poets
Islamic State of Iraq and the Levant members
1960 births